Now Playing was a short-lived entertainment magazine that focused on popular entertainment, including movies, television, music, DVDs, and games. It was published by the media conglomerate theGlobe.com, starting life as a special section in Computer Games magazine in 2004. In April, 2005, Now Playing launched as a separate magazine.  The headquarters was in Fort Lauderdale, Florida. It ceased publication in 2006 due to MySpace spam.  Within a year, parent company theGlobe.com was forced to shut down its other print titles as a result of an unfavorable ruling in a spam lawsuit.

References

Video game magazines published in the United States
Defunct computer magazines published in the United States
Home computer magazines
Magazines established in 2005
Magazines disestablished in 2006
Magazines published in Florida
2005 establishments in Florida
2006 disestablishments in Florida